During the 2004–05 English football season, Sheffield United competed in the Football League Championship.

Season summary
In 2004–05 season, Warnock once again brought in a host of new faces with the pick being arguably the signings of former Sheffield Wednesday players Bromby, Quinn and Geary. The Blades again flirted around the play-offs places but some inconsistent performances, which included only winning 5 of their last 20 Championship games, saw the club again fall just short of the top six.

Final league table

Results
Sheffield United's score comes first

Legend

Football League Championship

FA Cup

League Cup

Players

First-team squad
Squad at end of season

Left club during season

Transfers

In
 Jon Harley - Fulham, 21 June, free
 Barry Hayles - Fulham, 23 June, free
 Leigh Bromby - Sheffield Wednesday, 23 June, free
 Alan Quinn - Sheffield Wednesday, 23 June, free
 Andy Liddell - Wigan Athletic, 23 June
 Phil Barnes - Blackpool, 25 June, free
 Paul Thirlwell - Sunderland, 27 July, free
 Danny Cadamarteri - Leeds United, 30 September, £50,000
 Emanuele Gabrieli - 30 September, free
 Derek Geary - Stockport County, 22 October, £25,000 
 David Johnson - Nottingham Forest, 10 March, loan
 Luke Beckett - Stockport County, November, £50,000
 Danny Cullip - Brighton & Hove Albion, 17 December, £250,000
 Tommy Johnson - Gillingham
 Danny Haystead
 Adrian Harper

Out
 Mark Rankine - Tranmere Rovers, 3 June, free
 Wayne Allison - Chesterfield, 25 June, free
 Rob Page - Cardiff City, 2 July, free
 Andy Parkinson - Grimsby Town, July, free
 Kristian Rogers - Worksop Town
 Peter Ndlovu - Mamelodi Sundowns
 Colin Cryan - Scarborough
 Mike Whitlow - Notts County
 Dries Boussatta - Al-Shaab
 Danny Wood
 Dominic Roma
 Sasa Ilic
 Ben Purkiss
 Barry Hayles - Millwall
 Jack Lester - Nottingham Forest
 Emanule Gabrieli - released
 Ashley Sestanovich - Chester City
 Danny Reet - Sheffield Wednesday

Loans in
 Tommy Black - Crystal Palace, December, loan
 Danny Webber - Watford, 24 March, loan
 Ian Bennett - Birmingham City, loan

Loans out
 Paul Shaw - Rotherham United, loan
 Ashley Sestanovich - Grimsby Town, free
 Evan Horwood - Stockport County, 11 March, loan
 Colin Marrison - Leigh RMI, 11 March, work experience
 Jake Speight - Leigh RMI, 11 March, work experience
 Luke Beckett - Huddersfield Town, 18 March, loan
 Danny Cullip - Watford, 24 March, loan

References

Notes

Sheffield United F.C. seasons
Sheffield United F.C.